St. Theresa of Lisieux Catholic High School is a Catholic high school in Richmond Hill, a suburb of the Greater Toronto Area in Canada. The school is named after St. Theresa of Lisieux. The school was founded by the York Catholic District School Board in 2002. The first graduating class was that of 2005. The graduating class of 2006 was the first class to have gone through all four grades at this school.

The school team name is The Lions, with the mascot being Roary the Lion. St. Theresa's athletics offers a wide variety of sports and other recreational events held throughout the school year.

St. Theresa of Lisieux Catholic High School also offers the AP (Advanced Placement) and pre-AP program for students. Students in this regular program have the opportunity to participate in differentiated courses in English, Mathematics, Science, and Social Sciences.

Academics
St. Theresa of Lisieux currently ranks 8th in Ontario out of 739 high schools according to the Fraser Institute.

See also
List of high schools in Ontario

Notes

External links
St. Theresa of Lisieux Catholic High School

York Catholic District School Board
Educational institutions established in 2002
High schools in the Regional Municipality of York
Catholic secondary schools in Ontario
Education in Richmond Hill, Ontario
2002 establishments in Ontario